The Taifa of Constantina and Hornachuelos was a medieval taifa kingdom that existed, in what is now southern Spain, from around 1143 to 1150 when it was conquered by the Almohads.

List of emirs
To Morocco: 1091–c. 1143

Marwanid dynasty
Ibn Marwan: fl. mid-12th century
To Morocco: c. 1150–1248

1150 disestablishments
Constantina And Hornachuelos
States and territories established in the 1140s